Thihadeepa United FC is a Burmese football club, based at Thanlyin, Yangon. 2016 MNL-2 season is their first time MNL pro season. Thihadeepa is a University team and play in MNL-2. Thihadeepa teams retired the number 12 for their supporters.

History
Thihadeepa United FC was founded on 3 September 2013 at Thanlyin Technological University. Thiha Dipa Team and Pada Team combined and became Thanlyin Technological University FC. And then, they played in University Leagues. Name changed to 'Thihadeepa United FC'.

Players

First-team squad (2016)

 retired the number 12 for their supporters.

References
Thihadeepa page

External links
Myanmar Football Federation
Thihadeepa page

Football clubs in Myanmar
Association football clubs established in 2016
Myanmar National League clubs
University and college association football clubs
2016 establishments in Myanmar